Events from the year 1891 in Russia.

Incumbents
 Monarch – Alexander III

Events

Construction of the Trans-Siberian Railroad Begins

 Eastern journey of Nicholas II
 Ōtsu incident
 Russian famine of 1891–92

Births

 Sergei Prokofiev, April 23, 1891

Deaths

References

1891 in Russia
Years of the 19th century in the Russian Empire